Drăgoești is a commune located in Vâlcea County, Muntenia, Romania. It is composed of three villages: Buciumeni, Drăgoești and Geamăna.

References

Communes in Vâlcea County
Localities in Muntenia